Marcell Fodor (born 27 October 1987) is a Hungarian football defender who plays for Puskás Akadémia II.

Honours

Debreceni VSC
 Nemzeti Bajnokság I: 2009–10

References

DVSC profile
HLSZ profile 

1987 births
Living people
Sportspeople from Székesfehérvár
Hungarian footballers
Hungary youth international footballers
Hungary under-21 international footballers
Association football defenders
Fehérvár FC players
Újpest FC players
Diósgyőri VTK players
FC Felcsút players
Debreceni VSC players
BFC Siófok players
FC Ajka players
Zalaegerszegi TE players
Kaposvári Rákóczi FC players
Puskás Akadémia FC II players
Nemzeti Bajnokság I players
Nemzeti Bajnokság II players
Nemzeti Bajnokság III players